Achterdijk is a hamlet in the Dutch province of Utrecht. It is a part of the municipality of Vijfheerenlanden, and lies about 7 km northeast of Gorinchem.

The name of the hamlet means "Back Dike"; it refers to the dike between Leerdam and Arkel. The hamlet was first mentioned in 1869. Achterdijk has no place name signs, and the postal authorities have placed it under Nieuwland. In 1840, Achterdijk was home to 42 people.

Gallery

References

Populated places in Utrecht (province)
Vijfheerenlanden